The Sagas Of... is the debut studio album by Jamaican-English rapper Klashnekoff, released on 15 June 2004 by Kemet Entertainment. Three singles were released, "Its Murda", "All I Got", and "Parrowdice". "Its Murda" appeared in the soundtrack to the film Kidulthood.

Track listing

References

External links
The Sagas Of... at Discogs
The Sagas Of... at allmusic

2004 debut albums
Klashnekoff albums